Roderick Moore may refer to:

Roderick W. Moore, American Ambassador to Montenegro
Roderick "Rod the Bod" Moore, former boxer